Stefan Hajdin (born 15 April 1994) is a Serbian professional footballer who plays for Serbian club Voždovac.

Club career

Early years
Hajdin made his first football steps in Vršac, playing with local club Jedinstvo. Later was member of Red Star Belgrade academy from 2003 to 2008, and finally completed his youth career with Zemun, where he also made his first senior appearances in the Serbian League Belgrade. Next he moved to BASK and later to Dunav Stari Banovci. Finally, Hajdin joined Radnički Nova Pazova in summer 2014, where he affirmed in next three season, scoring 6 goals on 72 matches in the Serbian League Vojvodina. In summer 2016, Hajdin was also called into the amateur squad under Football Association of Vojvodina for the UEFA Regions' Cup.

Spartak Subotica
In summer 2017, Hajdin's agent Raša Bebić connected him with Spartak Subotica. Hajdin passed a trial period, spending the complete pre-season with club. After he convinced the management in friendly matches, Hajdin signed a four-year professional contract in July 2017. He made his official debut for the club in the first fixture match of the 2017–18 Serbian SuperLiga campaign against OFK Bačka. He scored his first goal for the club in 1–1 draw to his former club, Zemun, on 24 September 2017. He also scored in the last SuperLiga match in 2017, for 1–1 draw to Vojvodina on 13 December. During the first half-season with the club, Hajdin collected 23 matches in both domestic competitions usually as the first choice under coach Aleksandar Veselinović, missing the first round cup match against Polet Lipljan only.

Red Star Belgrade
On 12 January 2018, Hajdin agreed on a three-year deal with Red Star Belgrade. The transfer fee was reported as €200k plus 20 percent of the future transfer. He officially promoted in new club by sporting director Mitar Mrkela next day. Hajdin chose to wear number 34 jersey. Hajdin made his official debut for the club in the Serbian Cup match against Mačva Šabac on 14 March 2018. Hajdin also made his league debut for the club on 13 May 2018, replacing Milan Rodić in 52 minute of the away match against Vojvodina. After passing the complete pre-season with first team in summer 2018, Hajdin was excluded from the UEFA Champions League player list for the 2018–19 qualifying phase.

Playing style
Standing at 6-foot-2-and-a-half-inches (1.89 m), Hajdin uses both legs equally well. He usually operates as an offensive full-back or wing-back on the left flank, being capable of playing as a midfielder and participating in final actions. Although he mostly plays on the left side of the field, he often enters to the middle and take a shot with an inverted leg. Hajdin is also a long distance taker. While with Red Star Belgrade, Vladan Milojević used him as a right full-back respectively.

Career statistics

Club

Honours

Club
Red Star Belgrade
 Serbian SuperLiga (2): 2017–18, 2018–19

Personal life
Hajdin was born in Glina, Croatia but moved to Serbia at an early age. He had lived at Vršac and Zemun until he became an adult. Hajdin is a Sport and Physical Education faculty student at the University of Belgrade. Hajdin likes to read books in his spare time and as some of his favorite writers quotes Orhan Pamuk and Paulo Coelho.

References

External links
 
 
 
 

1994 births
Living people
People from Glina, Croatia
Serbs of Croatia
Association football defenders
Serbian footballers
FK Zemun players
FK BASK players
FK Radnički Nova Pazova players
FK Spartak Subotica players
Red Star Belgrade footballers
FK Voždovac players
Serbian SuperLiga players
People from the Republic of Serbian Krajina
Yugoslav Wars refugees